Wilhelm Emil "Willy" Messerschmitt (26 June 1898 – 15 September 1978) was a German aircraft designer and manufacturer. In 1934, in collaboration with Walter Rethel,  he designed the Messerschmitt Bf 109, which became the most important fighter aircraft in the Luftwaffe as Germany rearmed prior to World War II. It remains the second most-produced warplane in history, with some 34,000 built, behind the Soviet Ilyushin Il-2. Another Messerschmitt aircraft, first called "Bf 109R", purpose-built for record setting, but later redesignated Messerschmitt Me 209, broke the absolute world airspeed record and held the world speed record for propeller-driven aircraft until 1969. Messerschmitt's firm also produced the first jet-powered fighter to enter service — the Messerschmitt Me 262.

Early life
He was born in Frankfurt am Main, the son of Baptist Ferdinand Messerschmitt (1858–1916) and his second wife, Anna Maria Schaller (1867–1942).

First sailplane designs and World War I
As a young man, Messerschmitt befriended German sailplane pioneer Friedrich Harth. Harth joined the German army in 1914 and while he was away at war, Messerschmitt continued work on one of Harth's designs, the S5 glider. In 1917, Messerschmitt himself signed up for military service. Following the war, the two were reunited and continued to work together while Messerschmitt commenced study at the Munich Technical College and Harth built aircraft at the Bayerische Flugzeugwerke (BFW – Bavarian Aircraft Works). The S8 glider they designed and built together in 1921 broke a world duration record (albeit unofficially) and they went into partnership for a while running a flying school. The same year, the first plane entirely designed by Messerschmitt flew — the S9 glider.

Beginning of his career
In 1923 Messerschmitt graduated from the Munich Institute of Technology. The same year Harth and Messerschmitt had a falling out and went their separate ways, with Messerschmitt founding his own aircraft company at Augsburg. At first, Messerschmitt built sailplanes, but within two years had progressed via motor gliders to small powered aircraft - sports and touring types. These culminated in the Messerschmitt M 17 and Messerschmitt M 18 designs, which Messerschmitt sold to BFW in 1927, when the Bavarian state government encouraged a merger between the two companies. These were followed by the Messerschmitt M20 light transport in 1928, which proved a disaster for BFW and Messerschmitt himself. Two Deutsche Luft Hansa M20s were involved in serious crashes very soon after purchase, and this led the airline to cancel their order for the type. This caused a serious cashflow problem for the company and led to its bankruptcy in 1931. The M20 crashes also created a powerful enemy for Messerschmitt in the person of Erhard Milch, the head of Lufthansa, who had lost a close friend in one of the crashes.

Nazi Germany and World War II

The ties that Messerschmitt had formed with leading Nazis Rudolf Hess and Hermann Göring (through Theo Croneiss) saved him from sharing the fate of Milch's other great enemy, Hugo Junkers. To stay in business in the face of Milch ensuring that he would get no government contracts, Messerschmitt had signed agreements with Romania for sales of the M35 and a transport plane, the Messerschmitt M 36. When Milch learned of this, he publicly denounced Messerschmitt as a traitor, and the Gestapo was sent to question him and other BFW officials. Probably due to Croneiss' intervention, no further action was taken.

The establishment of the Reichsluftfahrtministerium ("Reich Aviation Ministry" - RLM) by the Nazi government in 1933, headed by Milch, led to a resurgence in the German aircraft industry and the resurrection of BFW. Collaborating with Robert Lusser, Messerschmitt designed the flagship product of the relaunched company. This was a low-wing four seater monoplane called the Messerschmitt M37, but better known by its later RLM designation of Bf 108. The following year, Messerschmitt incorporated many advanced design features of the Bf 108 into the Bf 109 fighter.

In 1936, the Messerschmitt Bf 109 won the RLM's single-seat fighter contest, and became one of the main Luftwaffe aircraft types. Messerschmitt and his factory thus took an important role in the RLM's armament plans. This role expanded even further when the Messerschmitt Bf 110 also won the multi-purpose fighter contest.

On 11 July 1938, Messerschmitt was appointed chairman and managing director of BFW and the company was renamed after him to Messerschmitt AG. This same year, the company began work on what would eventually become the Me 262, and on the Messerschmitt Me 210, planned as successor for the Bf 110. The Me 210 turned out to be plagued by massive development problems that were solved only by evolving the type into the Messerschmitt Me 410. The resulting problems and delays again put the reputation of both Messerschmitt and his namesake company in jeopardy.

Trial and postwar career

Following World War II, Messerschmitt was tried by a denazification court for using slave labor, and in 1948 was convicted of collaborating with the Nazi regime. After two years in prison, he was released and resumed his position as head of his company. Since Germany was forbidden to manufacture aircraft until 1955, he turned his company to manufacturing prefabricated buildings, sewing machines, and small cars — most notably the Messerschmitt Kabinenroller. Exporting his talents to Francoist Spain, he designed the Hispano HA-200 jet trainer for Hispano Aviación in Spain in 1952 before eventually being allowed to return to aircraft manufacturing in Germany to licence-produce the Fiat G91 and then Lockheed F-104 Starfighter for the West German Luftwaffe. He designed the later Helwan HA-300, a light supersonic interceptor, for the Egyptian air forces. This was his last aircraft design.

Messerschmitt saw his company through mergers first with Bölkow in 1968 and then Hamburger Flugzeugbau in 1969, at which point it became MBB (Messerschmitt-Bölkow-Blohm, that became part of EADS now named Airbus) with Messerschmitt as chairman until 1970 when he retired. He died eight years later, on 15 September 1978 in a Munich hospital in undisclosed circumstances.

Criticism
Messerschmitt's designs were characterized by a clear focus on performance, especially by striving for lightweight construction, but also by minimizing parasitic drag from aerodynamic surfaces. His critics accused him of taking this approach too far in some designs. His falling out with Harth had been over designs Harth felt to be dangerously unstable, and the Me 210 displayed instability, too, which could be cured only by enlarging the airframe and the aerodynamic surfaces, increasing drag and weight. Messerschmitt's design philosophy also is evident in his arguments with Alexander Lippisch, who was designing the tailless Me 163 rocket fighter for production at the Messerschmitt works. While Lippisch maintained that the tailless design had an advantage, in principle, with regard to total drag, Messerschmitt pointed out that the design compromises, which are necessary to make a tailless aircraft safely controllable, defeated this purpose by increasing drag to the original level and above.

Awards
Messerschmitt was appointed Honorary Professor by the Munich Technical College in 1930, and the Vice-President of the Deutsche Akademie für Luftfahrtforschung (German Academy of Aeronautical Research). The German government also awarded him the title of Wehrwirtschaftsführer (defense industry leader).  In 1938, Adolf Hitler bestowed upon Messerschmitt the German National Prize for Art and Science.

In 1979, Messerschmitt was inducted into the International Air & Space Hall of Fame at the San Diego Air & Space Museum.

References

External links

 
 Short Biography
 Harth & Messerschmitt Youtube Documentary

1898 births
1978 deaths
Aircraft designers
German industrialists
Businesspeople from Frankfurt
People from Hesse-Nassau
German aerospace engineers
German company founders
German aerospace businesspeople
20th-century German businesspeople
Messerschmitt people
Technical University of Munich alumni
Academic staff of the Technical University of Munich
Knights Commander of the Order of Merit of the Federal Republic of Germany
German Army personnel of World War I
Recipients of the Knights Cross of the War Merit Cross
Engineers from Frankfurt
Glider pilots